Farmington Township is one of twenty-six townships in Fulton County, Illinois, USA.  As of the 2010 census, its population was 3,350 and it contained 1,457 housing units.

History
Farmington Township is named after Farmington, Connecticut.

Geography

Cities, towns, villages
 Farmington
 Norris (north half)

Unincorporated towns
 Forty Acres
 Gilchrist
 Middlegrove
(This list is based on USGS data and may include former settlements.)

Cemeteries
The township contains these five cemeteries: Coal Creek, Hill, Oak Ridge, Pleasant Hill and Providence Chapel.

Major highways
  Illinois Route 78
  Illinois Route 116

Demographics

School districts
 Canton Union School District 66
 Farmington Central Community Unit School District 265

Political districts
 Illinois' 17th congressional district
 State House District 91
 State Senate District 46

References
 
 United States Census Bureau 2007 TIGER/Line Shapefiles
 United States National Atlas

External links
 City-Data.com
 Illinois State Archives

Townships in Fulton County, Illinois
Townships in Illinois